Leopard Capital LP is a private equity fund manager specializing in frontier market investments. The Group is considered a pioneer investor in Southeast Asia’s Greater Mekong Subregion and the Caribbean.

Structure and key personnel
Leopard Capital is a Cayman domiciled frontier market investment group established in 2007 by current CEO and founder Douglas Clayton. Clayton also recruited various renowned investors such as Dr. Jim Walker to serve as directors and shareholders.

Investment strategies
Leopard Capital creates private equity funds targeting pre-emerging, post-conflict or post-disaster economies that are undergoing transition and are poised for rapid growth. The funds invest commercially in basic industries, targeting attractive financial and social returns. Leopard Capital invests through a variety of financial instruments including equity, mezzanine, and debt.

Activities by country

Cambodia
During the 2008-9 financial crisis, Leopard raised $34.1 million for the Leopard Cambodia Fund, Cambodia's first private equity fund. The fund has since made thirteen investments in Cambodia, Laos and Thailand within various sectors including mobile telecoms, hydropower, electric transmission lines, banking, microfinance, beer and water production, seafood processing, agriculture, housing development and professional services.

Since its launch, Leopard Cambodia has exited five investments. In January 2011, Leopard Capital fully exited its investment in Cambodia's then- largest mobile telecommunications operator, CamGSM. The deal structure included a $5 million secured bridge loan. The transaction was awarded Telecomfinance's "2009 Asia Deal of the Year". The internal rate of return (IRR) for this investment was 26%. In May 2013, Leopard Cambodia profitably exited its full investment in Kulara Water, producers of Cambodia's first local mineral water, and also partially exited its investment in ACLEDA Bank at an attractive return.

Leopard Capital also participated in the initial public offering (IPO) of Electricite du Laos Generating Co. (EDL-Gen), the first listed company on the Lao Securities Exchange. The investment realized a partial exit through secondary trading on the Lao Securities Exchange, earning a 60% gain within a short period of time.  Leopard Capital also participated in the first IPO on the Cambodia Securities Exchange by investing in the Phnom Penh Water Supply Authority.

In February 2016, the company announced that it was winding down its Cambodia fund. 

In December 2016, Leopard Capital announced that it would not move forward with a second fund.

Leopard Cambodia Fund investment portfolio

 Kingdom Breweries - Cambodia's first micro-brewery, producing high-end beer in Phnom Penh.
 Tropical Beverage Co. - Thailand-based producer of Phuket Beer.
 Greenside Holdings - Rural power transmission and distribution system in Kampong Cham Province.
 Intean Poalroath Rongroeurng (IPR) - Cambodian agricultural microfinance institution providing credit to rice farmers.
 Engage Resources - Thailand-based developer and producer of kenaf.
 Angkor Residences - downtown land in Siem Reap, near Angkor Wat.
 ACLEDA Bank (partially exited) - Cambodia's leading bank with 232 branches nationwide and approximately 7,000 employees. The bank maintains a rural focus and has branches in Laos and Myanmar.
 Electricite du Laos Generating Co. (EDL-Gen) (partially exited) - Publicly traded operator of seven hydropower dams in Laos, totaling 387 MW.
 CamGSM (exited) - Cambodia's second largest mobile telecommunications network and leading internet services provider. Fully exited in January 2011 with IRR of 26%.
 Kulara Water (exited) - Cambodia's first local mineral water, bottled at the source in Siem Reap Province. Fully exited in May 2013.
 Phnom Penh Water Supply Authority (PPWSA) (exited) - Municipal water provider in Phnom Penh and the first listed company on the Cambodia Securities Exchange (CSX). Full exit through secondary trading, with 42% gain in short period.

Haiti
In 2012, Leopard's Capital's latest project, Leopard Haiti Fund, received a commitment of $8.5 million from the International Finance Corporation - the investment arm of The World Bank, $8.5 million from the Netherlands Development Finance Company, and $3 million from the Inter-American Development Bank's Multilateral Investment Fund, closing the initial round of funding with $20 million.

Leopard has an investment team on the ground in Port-au-Prince, and aims to raise up to $75 million to invest in four priority sectors: affordable housing, renewable energy, food processing and hotels.

In May 2013, Leopard Haiti made its first investment by providing equity financing to dloHaiti, a water kiosk venture that aims to provide safe, affordable drinking water to underserved neighborhoods across Haiti. dloHaiti’s water will exceed WHO health standards and be priced at a 25%-40% discount to other water sources.

On July 22, 2014, Leopard announced that it had invested $1.7 million in Veerhouse Voda Haiti S.A., a manufacturer of eco-friendly, disaster-resilient buildings in Haiti.

Bangladesh
On 25 March 2013, Leopard Bangladesh Fund received an anchor commitment of $15 million from the International Finance Corporation.

Awards 
Leopard Capital was named "Frontier Markets Investment Manager of the Year" in the 2013 Acquisition International M&A Awards. The firm was also named  "Private Equity House of the Year - Cambodia" in both the 2012 and 2013 awards, "Fund of the Year - Cambodia", and "Boutique Private Equity House of the Year - Haiti", all vanity awards.

A syndicated bridge loan to CamGSM in which Leopard Capital participated was named by TelecomFinance as “Asia Deal of the Year” for 2011.

In 2013, Leopard Capital was the subject of a case study by the Stanford Graduate School of Business focusing on frontier market private equity.

References

Further reading

External links
 Official website

Financial services companies established in 2007
Privately held companies of Cambodia
Investment companies of the Cayman Islands
Private equity firms of Cambodia
Private equity firms of Haiti